Mon oncle Antoine ("My Uncle Antoine") is a 1971 National Film Board of Canada (Office national du film du Canada) French-language drama film. Canadian director Claude Jutra co-wrote the screenplay with Clément Perron and directed one of the more acclaimed works in Canadian film history.

The film examines life in the Maurice Duplessis-era Asbestos Region of rural Québec before the Asbestos Strike of 1949. Set at Christmas time, the story is told from the point of view of a 15-year-old boy (Benoît, played by Jacques Gagnon) who is coming of age in a mining town. The Asbestos Strike is regarded by Québec historians as a seminal event in the years  before the Quiet Revolution (c. 1959–1970).

Jutra's film is an examination of the social conditions in Québec's old, agrarian, conservative and cleric-dominated society on the eve of the social and political changes that transformed the province a decade later.

Plot
Benoît is a young teenage boy living in rural Quebec. He works at the town general store belonging to his aunt Cécile and his uncle Antoine, who is also the town undertaker. On December 24, he begins work, setting up the store display much to the delight of the town and flirting with Carmen, the young girl whom his uncle and aunt employ, and treat as an adopted child.

Madame Jos Poulin's eldest son, Marcel, dies that day, and she places a call to the store asking if Antoine can come to take care of the body. For the first time, Benoît is allowed to go with him. After they load the body into a coffin, they prepare to take it home. However, on the way home, Benoît encourages the horse to run as quickly as possible causing the coffin to fall off the sleigh. He tries to get Antoine to help put the coffin back on the sleigh; however, Antoine who has been steadily drinking throughout the day is unable to lift the coffin. He confesses to Benoît that he hates dealing with the dead bodies and that he is miserable in his life, wishing that he had achieved his dream of owning a hotel in the U.S. as he had wanted. He confesses that, although he treats Benoît and Carmen like his own, he regrets that his wife was unable to give him children.

Angry with Antoine, Benoît manages to get him back in the sleigh and returns home. He runs up the stairs to get help from his aunt and discovers her embracing Fernand, the help, in her nightgown. Realizing what has happened, Fernand takes Benoît out in the sleigh to look for the body. Traumatized by seeing his aunt and Fernand together, Benoît is no help in remembering where the coffin fell off the sleigh. Eventually they make it back to the Poulin household where they find the entire Poulin family, including Jos, the father, who had been away working, around the coffin mourning the loss of Marcel. Jos looks at Benoît and the film ends.

Cast
 Jacques Gagnon as Benoît 
 Lyne Champagne as Carmen
 Jean Duceppe as Uncle Antoine
 Olivette Thibault as Aunt Cécile
 Claude Jutra as Fernand, Clerk
 Lionel Villeneuve as Jos Poulin
 Hélène Loiselle as Madame Poulin
 Mario Dubuc as Poulin's son
 Lise Brunelle as Poulin's daughter
 Alain Legendre as Poulin's son
 Robin Marcoux as Poulin's son
 Serge Evers as Poulin's son
 Monique Mercure as Alexandrine
 Georges Alexander as The Big Boss
 Rene Salvatore Catta as The Vicar

Production
Sydney Newman viewed the unfinished film in 1970, and told Jutra that he should delay the film for additional filming. The filming was done in February 1971, and added $40,000 onto the film. $237,214 of the film's budget was paid for by the NFB.

Release
The film was first shown at the 7th Moscow International Film Festival. It was released in theatres in 1971, and grossed $700,000 by 1974. The viewership of the movie rose to 2.5 million due to broadcasts by the Canadian Broadcasting Corporation in October 1973 and August 1974, the second-highest in the CBC's history.

Reception
The film won the Golden Hugo Award at the Chicago International Film Festival.

The film has twice been voted the greatest Canadian film in the Sight & Sound poll, conducted once each decade. The Toronto International Film Festival placed it first in the Top 10 Canadian Films of All Time three times.

This film has been designated and preserved as a masterwork by the Audio-Visual Preservation Trust of Canada, a charitable non-profit organisation dedicated to promoting the preservation of Canada’s audio-visual heritage.

It was featured in the TV series Canadian Cinema, which aired on CBC Television in 1974.

On 23 December 2008, Roger Ebert put Mon Oncle Antoine on his Great Movies list.

The film was selected as the Canadian entry for the Best Foreign Language Film at the 44th Academy Awards, but was not chosen as a nominee. It was entered into the 7th Moscow International Film Festival.

Accolades
This film has won numerous awards, in Canada and internationally, including 

 Chicago International Film Festival: Gold Hugo for Best Feature Film, Silver Hugo for Best Screenplay, November 5 to 20, 1971, Chicago
 Canadian Film Awards: Feature Film, Director, Screenplay, Cinematography, Actor (Jean Duceppe), Supporting Actress (Olivette Thibault), Musical Score, Overall Sound, October 1, 1971, Toronto
 Hemi Award: Best Direction, Best Actress, Best role by a teenager, February 9 to 11, 1976, San Antonio
 Toronto International Film Festival: Best Canadian Film, September 6 to 15, 1984, Toronto

See also
 List of Christmas films
 List of submissions to the 44th Academy Awards for Best Foreign Language Film
 List of Canadian submissions for the Academy Award for Best Foreign Language Film
 Roman du terroir, rural novels in Quebec literature

References

Works cited

External links
 Watch Mon oncle Antoine at NFB.ca
 
 
 
 Close-up: Mon oncle Antoine critique of the film and its legacy
 Mon oncle Antoine article by Barry Keith Grant published in the June–September 2004 issue of Take One
  Roger Ebert's Great Movies entry for the film.
Mon oncle Antoine: Of Asbestos Mines and Christmas Candy an essay by André Loiselle at the Criterion Collection

1971 films
1970s Christmas drama films
1970s Christmas films
1970s coming-of-age drama films
Best Picture Genie and Canadian Screen Award winners
Canadian Christmas drama films
Canadian coming-of-age drama films
Films directed by Claude Jutra
Films set in the 1940s
Films set in Quebec
Films shot in Quebec
1970s French-language films
National Film Board of Canada films
1971 drama films
French-language Canadian films
1970s Canadian films